THE BEST "Blue" is the first best of album released by Japanese girl group Kalafina. It was released at the same time as another Kalafina's compilation album THE BEST "Red". It was released in a limited CD+Blu-ray edition and a regular CD Only edition.

Track listing

Charts

References

2014 compilation albums
Japanese-language compilation albums
Kalafina albums
Sony Music Entertainment Japan compilation albums
SME Records albums